Vande Gujarat is a state owned educational and geographical television channel in India.

Channel list

 Vande Gujarat 2
 Vande Gujarat 3
 Vande Gujarat 4
 Vande Gujarat 5
 Vande Gujarat 6
 Vande Gujarat 7
 Vande Gujarat 8
 Vande Gujarat 9
 Vande Gujarat 10
 Vande Gujarat 11
 Vande Gujarat 12
 Vande Gujarat 13
 Vande Gujarat 14
 Vande Gujarat 15
 Vande Gujarat 16
 BISAG Utra
 BISAG Sinces
 BISAG Earth 
 BISAG Marsh

See also
 List of programs broadcast by DD National
 All India Radio
 Ministry of Information and Broadcasting
 DD Direct Plus
 List of South Asian television channels by country

External links
 Official website

Doordarshan
Foreign television channels broadcasting in the United Kingdom
Television channels and stations established in 2015
Indian direct broadcast satellite services
Television stations in Ahmedabad
Gujarati-language television channels in India